BPL may refer to:

Places
 Bhopal Junction railway station, India (by station code)
 Bole Alashankou Airport, China (by IATA airport code)
 The contractional slang for Blackpool, UK

Economics and finance
 Bank pool loan, a type of loan
 Below Poverty Line (India), an economic indicator
 Bloomberg Polarlake, a subsidiary of Bloomberg L.P

Enterprises
 BPL Group, an electronics conglomerate in India

Public libraries
 Birmingham Public Library, in Alabama, United States
 Boston Public Library, in Massachusetts, United States
 Brooklyn Public Library, in New York, United States
 Burnaby Public Library, in British Columbia, Canada
 Bloomington Public Library. in Illinois, United States

Science and technology
 beta-Propiolactone, a compound used for virus deactivation, and as a precursor for synthesis of other compounds.
 Bio Products Laboratory, UK blood plasma products company
 BPL (complexity), a computational complexity theory descriptor
 BPL (time service), a long-wave time signal service from China
 Broadband over power lines, in telecommunications
 Biopollution level
 Bone phosphate of lime or Tricalcium phosphate
 In mathematics, the classifying space of piecewise linear structures on a manifold

Sports
 Bangladesh Premier League, a Twenty20 cricket league
 Bangladesh Premier League (football), an association football league
 Brisbane Premier League, an association football league in Australia
 Premier League, Great Britain, as previously known as Barclays Premier League

See also
 Calculus of negligence, also known as the BPL formula